Joseph Henderson (21 December 1924 – 15 February 1984) in Cleland, North Lanarkshire, Scotland, was a Scottish retired professional footballer who played as a goalkeeper in the Football League.

References

External links 
Joe Henderson, www.ihibs.co.uk

1924 births
1984 deaths
Scottish footballers
Hibernian F.C. players
Accrington Stanley F.C. (1891) players
Albion Rovers F.C. players
Northampton Town F.C. players
Canterbury City F.C. players
Stranraer F.C. players
Stenhousemuir F.C. players
Dumbarton F.C. players
English Football League players
Scottish Football League players
Association football goalkeepers
People from Cleland, North Lanarkshire
Footballers from North Lanarkshire